A total solar eclipse occurred on May 20, 1947. A solar eclipse occurs when the Moon passes between Earth and the Sun, thereby totally or partly obscuring the image of the Sun for a viewer on Earth. A total solar eclipse occurs when the Moon's apparent diameter is larger than the Sun's, blocking all direct sunlight, turning day into darkness. Totality occurs in a narrow path across Earth's surface, with the partial solar eclipse visible over a surrounding region thousands of kilometres wide. Totality was visible from Chile including the capital city Santiago, Argentina, Paraguay, Brazil, Liberia, French West Africa (the parts now belonging to Ivory Coast and Benin), 
British Gold Coast (today's Ghana) including capital Accra, French Togoland (today's Togo) including capital Lomé, British Nigeria (today's Nigeria) including capital Lagos, French Cameroons (now belonging to Cameroon), French Equatorial Africa (the parts now belonging to Central African Republic and R. Congo), Belgian Congo (today's DR Congo), British Uganda (today's Uganda), British Tanganyika (now belonging to Tanzania), and British Kenya (today's Kenya). The southern part of Aconcagua, the highest mountain outside Asia, and Iguazu Falls, one of the largest waterfalls systems in the world, lie in the path of totality.

Related eclipses

Solar eclipses 1946–1949

Saros 127

Tritos series

Metonic series

References

External links

 Russia expedition for solar eclipse of May 20, 1947

1947 05 20
1947 in science
1947 05 20
May 1947 events